Araeopteron proleuca is a moth of the family Noctuidae first described by Edward Meyrick in 1913. It is found in India and Sri Lanka.

References

Moths of Asia
Moths described in 1907
Boletobiinae